The Jardin aux Plantes la Bouichère (2 hectares) is a private botanical garden specializing in fragrant plants. It is located on the banks of the river Aude in the Domaine de Flassian, Rue Dewoitine, Limoux, Aude, Languedoc-Roussillon, France, and open Wednesday through Sunday in the warmer months; an admission fee is charged.

The garden was created circa 2001, and now contains some 2,500 perennials, shrubs, and trees, with a focus on aromatic plants, including 60 types of salvia and 30 types of mint. The garden is organized into a number of small areas: an exotic garden, garden of colors, vegetable garden, rose garden, moon garden, medieval garden, orchard, nursery, and vineyard. It also contains a collection of conifers and grasses, as well as an aviary of birds from Australia, Asia, and South America.

See also
 List of botanical gardens in France

References
 Jardin aux Plantes la Bouichère
 French Gardens entry
 1001 Fleurs entry (French)
 Gralon entry (French)
 Conservatoire des Jardins et Paysages entry (French)

Gardens in Aude
Botanical gardens in France